Padmanabha Ranganathan, more commonly known as P. Ranganathan, (born 25 April 1964) is an Indian former first-class cricketer from the state of Kerala. He played as an opening batsman for Kerala cricket team in Ranji trophy. He is a BCCI level B coach and was appointed as the coach of Kerala team for 2010-11 season in May 2010..He has scored 1110 runs from 26 matches and has got a wicket. His highest score is 101.

References

1964 births
Living people
People from Thiruvananthapuram
Kerala cricketers
Indian cricketers
Indian cricket coaches

Malayali people